Mingoola may refer to:

 Mingoola, New South Wales, a town in New South Wales, Australia
 Mingoola, Queensland, a locality in the Southern Downs Region, Queensland, Australia